Fich is a surname. Notable people with the surname include:
 Charlotte Fich (born 1961), Danish stage, film and television actress
  (1949–2012), Danish politician
 Peter Christiansen Fich (born 1941), Danish rower
 Thomas Fich (died 1517), Irish ecclesiastic and compiler

See also 
 Shast Fich (disambiguation)